Vahid Shafiei (born 29 September 1992) is an Iranian professional futsal player. He is a Defender, and currently a member of Cosmo FC in the Indonesia Pro Futsal League.

Honours

Country 
 AFC Futsal Championship
 Runners-up (1): 2014
 Asian Indoor and Martial Arts Games
 Champion (1): 2013

Club 
 AFC Futsal Club Championship
 Third place (1): 2014 (Dabiri)
 Chinese Futsal League
 Champions (1): 2017–18 (Shenzhen Nanling)
 Iran Futsal's 1st Division
 Champions (1): 2011–12 (Shahrdari Tabriz)

International goals

References 

1992 births
Living people
People from Qazvin
Iranian men's futsal players
Futsal defenders
Dabiri FSC players
Shahrdari Saveh FSC players
Sunich FSC players
Araz Naxçivan players
Giti Pasand FSC players
Iranian expatriate futsal players
Iranian expatriate sportspeople in China
Iranian expatriate sportspeople in Azerbaijan
Iranian expatriate sportspeople in Indonesia